Marek Maciej Siwiec (born 13 March 1955 in Piekary Slaskie) is a Polish politician and journalist.

Biography
Marek Maciej Siwiec studied physics at the AGH University of Science and Technology (1980) and completed Post-Diploma Study of Journalism in 1989at the Academy of Social Sciences – Centre for Education of the Foreign Service. 

He is married to Ewa, with whom he has two children.

Journalism career
Between 1985 and 1987 he was Editor-in-chief of the bi-weekly 'Student', then weekly magazine 'ITD' (1987–1990) and the daily newspaper 'Trybuna'.

Political career
From 1991 until 1997 he was a member of Parliament of the Polish Republic (Sejm) for the Kalisz Constituency. In years 1993-1995 he was also Member of National Broadcasting Council.

In 1996 he was appointed as a secretary of state in a Chancellery of the President of the Republic of Poland, Aleksander Kwaśniewski.

One year later (1997) he took over as a Chief of the National Security Bureau (Poland). He held that position until 2004, when he was elected Member of the European Parliament from Greater Poland Voivodship.

From January 2007 to June 2009 he served as Vice-President of the European Parliament. He also chaired the Delegation to the EU-Ukraine Parliamentary Cooperation Committee. He was an observer of several elections in Ukraine between 2004 and 2014.

In December 2011-April 2012 he was vice-chairman of Democratic Left Alliance, polish social-democratic political party.

During his tenure in European Parliament he also served as a coordinator of the Group of the Progressive Alliance of Socialists and Democrats for the Euronest Parliamentary Assembly. He was member of the Board of Yalta European Strategy foundation, President of European Friends of Israel, and member of Global Leadership Council of Colorado State University.

In 2016 he was appointed as a Chief Executive Officer of Babi Yar Holocaust Memorial Center, a non-governmental organization with its mission to respectfully commemorate the victims of the Babi Yar and to promote the humanization of mankind through the memory preservation and study of the history of the Holocaust. Since 2019, he has served as a Senior Public Affairs Advisor for the European Union.

Career timeline
 1981–1982: Assistant at the Electronics Institute of AGH (1980–1982), traineeship with the Gas and Fuel Corporation of Victoria, Australia
 1985–1991: Editor-in-chief of the bi-monthly 'Student' (1985–1987), weekly 'ITD' (1987–1990) and the daily 'Trybuna'
 1991–1997: Member of Parliament of the Polish Republic (Sejm)
 1993: Spokesman for the Democratic Left Alliance (SLD) Parliamentary Party
 1993–1996: Member of the National National Broadcasting Council
 1993–1996: Member of the Parliamentary Assembly of the Council of Europe
 1996–2004: Secretary of State at the Chancellery of the President of the Republic of Poland
 1997–2004: Chief of the National Security Bureau (Poland)
 1997–2004: Vice-Chairman of the Consultative Committee of the presidents of Poland and Ukraine
 Secretary of the National Security Council (2000–2004) head of the Polish Association of Friends of the Peres Center for Peace
 Chairman of the Supervisory Board of the Foundation to Counter Terrorism and Biological Threats
 Member of the National Administration of the SLD
 Head of the national delegation to the Party of European Socialists in the EP

Awards and recognition 
 Order of Gedymin (1997, LT), Cavaliere di Gran Croce (1997, I), Ordem do Merito (1997, P), Ordre de Leopold (1999, B)
 National Order of Merit (2000, F)
 Ubique Patriae Memor (2002, BR)
 Grand Cross of the Order of Merit (2003, LT)
 Virtutea Militară (2003, RO)
 Royal Victorian Order (2004, GB)
 Order of Prince Yaroslav the Wise, 4th and 3rd Class (1997, 2004, UA)

Controversy
During presidency campaign in 2000 a film was published revealing Marek Siwiec, then the chief of National Security Bureau, allegedly parodying a gesture of then pope John Paul II (making a cross sign in the air on arrival). In November 2007 Institute of National Remembrance (Commission for the Prosecution of Crimes against the Polish Nation), revealed that in 1986 he was registered as a Secret Collaborator until January 1990. Marek Siwiec denied those claims. On 26 March 2009 Institute of National Remembrance, after its own investigation, decided about discontinuance of the proceedings due to lack of evidence about collaboration.

See also
 2004 European Parliament election in Poland
 2009 European Parliament election in Poland

References

External links
 
 

People from Piekary Śląskie
1955 births
Living people
Members of the Polish Sejm 1991–1993
Members of the Polish Sejm 1993–1997
Democratic Left Alliance MEPs
MEPs for Poland 2004–2009
MEPs for Poland 2009–2014
Recipients of the Order of the Cross of Terra Mariana, 2nd Class
Your Movement politicians